Marco Warren (born 13 December 1993) is a Bermudian footballer who plays as a midfielder for PHC Zebras in the Bermudian Premier Division. He made his debut for the Bermuda national team in 2015.

Career

Marco Warren was born in Warwick Parish, Bermuda. He started his career at Flagler College, where he originally studied Graphic Design as well as receiving a sports scholarship. He began to play for the college team in 2012, known as the Flagler Saints, who were then playing in the NCAA Division II. In his first season, he played in all of the 19 available games and scored 1 goal. He also appeared in all the available games for the 2013 season, this time getting 7 goals in 19 games. For his final college season in 2014 he played 10 games and scored 1 goal. In total in 3 years for Flagler Saints he played in 48 games, scoring 9 goals. After leaving college at the end of 2014, he joined Bermudian Premier Division side PHC Zebras.

International career

In 2012 Marco Warren played 3 games for the Bermuda U-20s team in the 2012 CONCACAF Gold Cup, his debut coming in a 0–2 loss against Barbados U-20

Marco Warren made his debut for the Bermuda national football team on 8 March 2015 in a 3–0 victory over Grenada. He got an assist and was only stopped from scoring on his debut by a last ditch tackle from a Grenada defender. He has gone on to receive nine official caps for Bermuda.

Trivia

He is the son of former Bermuda National Footballer and Boulevard Blazers midfielder Dwight Warren, has two sisters, and he lists Ronaldinho as his favorite footballer.

References

1993 births
Living people
Bermudian footballers
Bermuda international footballers
Association football midfielders
People from Warwick Parish
Flagler College alumni
2019 CONCACAF Gold Cup players
Montverde Academy alumni